Kehillah Jewish High School is an independent college preparatory high school located in Palo Alto, California. "Kehillah" is a Hebrew word meaning "community."  The school is one of a series of pluralistic (community) Jewish day schools in the United States at the high school level.

In the fall of 2005, the school moved from its original location in San Jose to its new campus at 3900 Fabian Way, Palo Alto, where it also hosted the Keddem Congregation (Reconstructionist Judaism) for several years.

Kehillah Jewish High School was founded in 1999 and opened in the fall of 2002 on the Blackford High School campus in San Jose with 32 9th grade students. Rabbi Reuven Greenvald joined Kehillah as its Head of School in the summer of 2004 and left in March 2007. He was replaced by Lillian Howard, who most recently served as the founding Head of School of the Shoshana S. Cardin School in Baltimore, Maryland. Upon Lillian Howard's retirement in June 2013, Rabbi Darren Kleinberg, Ph.D. became the  Head of School. Rabbi Darren Kleinberg, Ph.D. left in the end of the 2019-2020 school year. During the 2020-2021 school year, Dr. Daisy Pellant became the new Head of the School.

Since 2002, Kehillah Jewish High School has grown from a 9th-grade class of 33 students to a community of approximately 220 students in grades 9-12. The school experienced multiple years of double-digit enrollment growth. In 2016 Kehillah was described as the fastest-growing Jewish community high school in North America by Marc Kramer, co-executive director of Ravsak, a national Jewish community day school network.

In addition to American students, Kehillah has a large Israeli student population. Students’ first languages include Russian, Hebrew, Spanish, and French as well as English. They live as far south as Morgan Hill, as far north as Burlingame, and as far east as Castro Valley and Fremont.  Approximately half attended public school through 8th grade, and the other half attended private and public middle schools.

Campus
The new  campus at 3900 Fabian Way in Palo Alto, California was completed for the 2005–2006 academic year.  It is situated across the street from the recently opened Taube-Koret Campus for Jewish Life, a new development for the Palo Alto JCC and the senior home. The facility was originally constructed in 1997, and was extensively remodeled in 2005.  The building includes 27 classrooms, four tutorial rooms, high-end physics, chemistry, biology, and computer science laboratories, music and art rooms, a photo lab, a makerspace, a library and assembly space, student and faculty work and meeting spaces, faculty and administrative office clusters, and a Beit Midrash – a room for prayer and study. Each teaching space is equipped with extensive electronic media and SMARTBoard technology. The campus was most recently renovated in the summer of 2016, during which the library, theater, and student learning center were redesigned. After the COVID-19 pandemic, in the summer of 2021, the campus was renovated again to remodel all classrooms. The library, student center, and hangout spaces were also redone to look and feel more inclusive.

References

External links
 Official website
 North American Association of Jewish High Schools
 Partnership for Excellence in Jewish Education
 Private Schools in the Bay Area
 

Pluralistic Jewish day schools
Jewish day schools in California
High schools in Santa Clara County, California
Educational institutions established in 1999
Private high schools in California
Buildings and structures in Palo Alto, California
1999 establishments in California
Reconstructionist Judaism in the United States